Saint Ephraim of Antioch, also known as Saint Ephraim of Amida (Syriac: ܐܦܪܝܡ ܐܡܕܝܐ), was the Patriarch of Antioch, and head of the Greek Orthodox Church of Antioch, from 527 until his death in 545. He is venerated as a saint in the Eastern Orthodox Church and Roman Catholic Church, and his feast day is 8 June, and additionally 7 March in the Orthodox Church.

Biography

Early life
Ephraim was the son of a certain Appianus, and was born in the city of Amida in the fifth century, where he became fluent in both Greek and Syriac. Ephraim was later employed in the civil government, and served as a military general during the reigns of Emperor Anastasius and his successor Emperor Justin I. In 522, Ephraim was appointed comes Orientis by Emperor Justin and undertook stern measures against the Blues, a chariot racing faction, who had rioted earlier that year. Rioting within the city ceased as a result of Ephraim's actions, and, in 524/525, he was bestowed the honorary title of comes sacrarum largitionum, thus granting him admission to the senate. Ephraim carried out building works in Antioch in November 524 or February, June or July 525.

In late 525, Ephraim was replaced by Anatolius, but was re-appointed comes Orientis by 29 May 526, at which time an earthquake struck Antioch. Ephraim began reconstruction of the city, during which he saw a pillar of fire rise from a sleeping stone-cutter to the sky. The saint awoke the stone-cutter who revealed he had formerly been a bishop and prophesied that Ephraim would become Patriarch of Antioch. Ephraim's efforts to rebuild the city earned him the affinity of the people of Antioch and many called for him to succeed Euphrasius as patriarch, as he had died in the earthquake of 526. At the request of the people of Antioch, Ephraim became a monk, and was consecrated Patriarch of Antioch in April/May 527.

Patriarch of Antioch
In 528, Antioch was struck by another earthquake, during which under 5000 people were killed, and the saint helped to rebuild the city once more. Antioch continued to suffer earthquakes and many fled the city, however, Ephraim commanded the people to write "May Christ be with us" over the doors of their houses. The earthquake subsequently stopped, and thus Antioch was called Theopolis (city of God). Al-Mundhir III, King of the Lakhmids, invaded Syria and enslaved a number of prisoners in 529, and in the following year the prisoners appealed to Ephraim who paid their ransom. Non-Chalcedonians rioted in Antioch in 531 and attacked the patriarchal palace, but were driven off by the comes Orientis. Ephraim wrote to Anthimus, Archbishop of Trebizond, prior to his consecration as patriarch of Constantinople on the natures of Christ and the heresy of Eutychianism, and reminded him of the importance of the Council of Chalcedon. Later, Anthimus became patriarch in 535 and adopted non-Chalcedonianism, which led Ephraim to send Sergius of Reshaina with a letter to Rome to meet with Pope Agapetus I and warn him that non-Chalcedonians had secured control of the Churches of Alexandria and Constantinople. Agapetus consequently intervened and Anthimus was deposed in 536.

After Emperor Justinian I issued an edict banning the writings of Severus of Antioch in August 536, the saint undertook a tour of Syria and Mesopotamia alongside a contingent of soldiers to enforce the Council of Chalcedon and persecute its opponents, and travelled to Chalcis, Beroea, Hierapolis, Batnae, Edessa, Sura, Callinicum, Theodosioupolis, Constantina, and Amida. Ephraim had non-Chalcedonian monks driven out from their monasteries in the middle of winter, imprisoned those who refused to accept the council, and erected pyres in some cases. According to his hagiography, Ephraim met with a non-Chalcedonian stylite near the city of Hierapolis or Heracleia and attempted to convert him, however, the stylite was unconvinced. The stylite built a bonfire and argued he and the saint should both enter the bonfire to test who was right, to which Ephraim put his omophorion in the fire. After three hours, the omophorion was removed from the bonfire unharmed and the stylite renounced his heresy. Ephraim sent his brother John, a satrap of an Armenian principality, to Amida to convince non-Chalcedonian monks to accept the Council of Chalcedon, however, they refused and John was forced to expel them from the city.

At this time, according to Michael the Syrian, Ephraim was sent as an ambassador to Al-Harith ibn Jabalah, King of the Ghassanids by Emperor Justinian I, and unsuccessfully attempted to persuade the king to accept the Council of Chalcedon. In 537, Ephraim conspired to imprison the non-Chalcedonian clergyman John of Tella, who had taken refuge in the Sassanian Empire, and thus allegedly told the Sassanian government that John had committed simony and was a rebel. The Sasanian government captured John and transferred him to Ephraim, who subsequently humiliated and imprisoned John at Antioch, where he died in 538. In 537/538, Ephraim held a synod at Antioch, which was attended by 132 bishops, and declared his approval of the synod held at Constantinople in 536 and condemned Severus of Antioch. Syncleticus, Archbishop of Tarsus, and his syncellus Stephen, who were suspected of adherence to Eutychianism, were considered by the synod, but were acquitted after a confession of faith.

Eruption of war between the Sassanians and Romans led Antioch to come under siege by Sassanian forces in 540. Ephraim unsuccessfully attempted to pay the Sassanians to relieve their siege on several occasions, however, the Sassanians seized the city and Ephraim fled to Cilicia, where he remained until the Romans retook Antioch. The cathedral of Antioch and its buildings were spared destruction after Ephraim paid the Sassanian forces in precious objects. In 542, Ephraim travelled to Jerusalem, where he met with six Sabaite monks who had been expelled from their monasteries by Origenists. The monks appealed to the saint to act against Origenism. Ephraim then attended the Synod of Gaza alongside Hypatius, Archbishop of Ephesus, and Patriarch Peter of Jerusalem and condemned and deposed Patriarch Paul of Alexandria.

Ephraim held a synod at Antioch in 542 in which he condemned Origen and supporters of his doctrines. In an attempt to heal the rift between supporters and opponents of the council of Chalcedon, Emperor Justinian I issued an edict in late 543 or early 544 that condemned the so-called Three Chapters, thus beginning the Three-Chapter Controversy. The saint initially refused to agree to the edict, however, the emperor threatened Ephraim with deposition, after which he agreed to condemn the Three Chapters, and wrote to Pope Vigilius to declare he had only agreed under force. Ephraim died in the following year.

References

Bibliography

545 deaths
Church Fathers
Greek Orthodox Patriarchs of Antioch
Byzantine saints
Year of birth unknown
Syrian archbishops
Roman governors of Syria
6th-century Byzantine bishops
5th-century Byzantine bishops
5th-century births
Syrian Christian saints
5th-century Christian saints
6th-century Christian saints
5th-century Christian theologians
6th-century Christian theologians
Comites Orientis
Miracle workers
Ancient Christians involved in controversies
6th-century Byzantine writers
6th-century archbishops